The Virginia Derby is a Grade III American Thoroughbred horse race for three-year-olds over a distance of one and one-eighth miles on the turf held annually in September at Colonial Downs in New Kent County, Virginia.  The event currently carries a purse of $300,000.

History

The inaugural running of the event was 3 October 1998 as part of the newly opened racetrack in Virginia known as Colonial Downs at a distance of  miles on the outer turf course. 

The quality of the event consistently improved and in 2004 the American Graded Stakes Committee upgraded the classification to Grade III status. That year the winner was Kenneth and Sarah Ramsey's Kitten's Joy who later in the year captured the crown of U.S. Champion Male Turf Horse. The 2005 winner English Channel later in his career won the Breeders' Cup Turf and in 2007 was also crowned U.S. Champion Male Turf Horse.

In 2006 the event was upgraded to Grade II which attracted the finest three-year-old turf horses with a massive US$1 million purse.

However the track ran into a dispute between track management and horsemen's organizations and the track closed after the 2013 meeting.

The event was not held in 2014. 

In 2015 the event was moved to Laurel Park in Laurel, Maryland and was renamed to the Commonwealth Derby and the distance was decreased to  miles. 

The event was down graded to Grade III in 2017.

In 2018 the event was not held, but Virginia laws were amended with regard to funding horse racing and the Colonial Downs reopened in 2019 and the event was scheduled as the New Kent County Virginia Derby.

In 2020 due to the COVID-19 pandemic in the United States, the track canceled the meeting prior to the running of the event.

Records 
Speed: 
  miles: 1:59.62 - Red Giant (2007)
  miles: 1:45.81 (new track record) - Just Howard  (2017)

Margins: 
  lengths – English Channel (2005)

Most wins by an owner:
 3 -  Peter Vegso  (2002, 2003, 2006)

Most wins by a jockey:
 3 - Edgar S. Prado (2002, 2003, 2004)

Most wins by a Trainer:
 3 - Todd Pletcher (2005, 2007, 2022)
 3 - William I. Mott (2002, 2003, 2006)
 3 - Dale L. Romans (2004, 2010, 2012)
 3 - H. Graham Motion (2017, 2019, 2021)

Winners

See also
 List of American and Canadian Graded races

References

Graded stakes races in the United States
Turf races in the United States
Flat horse races for three-year-olds
Horse races in Virginia
Recurring sporting events established in 1998
1998 establishments in Virginia
Grade 3 stakes races in the United States